Censor is a 2021 British psychological horror film directed by Prano Bailey-Bond. It was produced from a screenplay by Bailey-Bond and Anthony Fletcher. The film stars Niamh Algar, Nicholas Burns, Vincent Franklin, Sophia La Porta, Adrian Schiller and Michael Smiley.

Censor had its world premiere at the 2021 Sundance Film Festival on 28 January 2021. It received the Méliès d'Or for Best European Fantastic Film.

Plot
In 1985, Enid Baines works for the British Board of Film Classification during the height of the Video Nasty controversy. Enid's co-workers call her "Little Miss Perfect" due to her insistence that violent content be cut or banned. While Enid is having dinner with her parents, they discuss Enid's sister Nina, who disappeared when the two were little. Enid's parents have since declared Nina legally dead, but Enid believes she is still alive.

Shortly after a man murders his wife and children, a tabloid newspaper links the killings to a film Enid had rated several months prior, naming her as the censor who approved it. Enid starts receiving threatening and insulting phone calls on a regular basis. One day, Enid is approached by Doug Smart, a film producer who claims veteran horror director Frederick North has personally requested she screen one of his old films, Don't Go in the Church. While watching, Enid notices that the film depicts events similar to her memories of Nina's disappearance.

Investigating North further by acquiring a copy of one of his banned films, Enid notices that the film's lead, Alice Lee, bears a resemblance to her missing sister. Enid soon becomes obsessed with meeting North, believing that Lee is her missing sister, and needs to be saved from the exploitation film industry. When Enid visits Smart, hoping to learn North's whereabouts, he tells her that North is making a sequel to Don't Go in the Church near his home, and attempts to rape her. Enid rejects Smart, causing him to become more aggressive before Enid pushes him back, tripping and accidentally impaling him on a film award. Smart dies as Enid stares in shock, unable to process what has happened.

After stealing North's address from her work, Enid finds the set of North's latest film, where he and the crew assume her to be an actress. During a climactic scene, Enid kills an actor named Charles with an axe, thinking that he was going to hurt her "sister". A terrified Alice flees from Enid as she begs for Alice to "please be her" before collapsing in the woods. A remote control appears in Enid's hand, and she presses a button.

Enid is awoken by a seemingly happy vision of her sister, thanking Enid for finding her. Nina and Enid leave the woods and drive to their parent's home. During the drive, the car radio announces that all violent films have been banned, crime has been eradicated, and unemployment no longer exists. Enid's fantasy is sporadically interrupted, revealing that she has kidnapped Alice, who is begging Enid's parents for help as Enid smiles. The camera then pans out of a TV screen, and a VHS tape with the title Censor comes out of a VCR, implying that the film was just a movie someone else was watching.

Cast
 Niamh Algar as Enid Baines
 Nicholas Burns as Sanderson
 Vincent Franklin as Fraser
 Sophia La Porta as Alice Lee / "Nina Baines"
 Adrian Schiller as Frederick North
 Michael Smiley as Doug Smart
 Clare Holman as June
 Andrew Havill as George
 Felicity Montagu as Valerie
 Danny Lee Wynter as Perkins
 Clare Perkins as Anne
 Guillaume Delaunay as Beastman / Charles
 Richard Glover as Gerald
 Erin Shanagher as Debbie 
 Matthew Earley as Gordon
 Richard Renton as Frank
 Beau Gadsdon as Young Enid
 Amelie Child-Villiers as Young Nina

Production 
Filming primarily took place in Leeds and Bradford in West Yorkshire, England. The set of 'Gerald's Videos' store was created in Pudsey. The film was primarily shot on 35mm film, with some Super8 and VHS footage.

Release
The film had its world premiere at the 2021 Sundance Film Festival on 28 January 2021 in the Midnight section. On 23 February 2021, Magnolia Pictures acquired the US distribution rights to the film, with plans to release it through its Magnet Releasing banner in theatres in the United States on 11 June 2021. It was released across the UK and Ireland on 20 August 2021 via Vertigo Releasing. Additionally, Metro-Goldwyn-Mayer owns the film's worldwide home media rights and international television rights, especially on Blu-ray releases in which the 2021 MGM logo is shown at the beginning and end of this film.

Critical reception 
On Rotten Tomatoes, the film has an approval rating of 89% based on reviews from 149 critics, with an average rating of 7.30/10. The website's critics consensus reads, "Occasionally uneven but bold and viscerally effective, Censor marks a bloody good step forward for British horror."  Writing for RogerEbert.com, Simon Abrams concluded that "Censor is, in [a] sense, a success, if only because it winds you up, and leaves you wanting a lot more where it came from." Mark Kermode of The Observer rated the film five out of five stars. Peter Bradshaw of The Guardian described the film as a "very elegant and disquieting debut" and rated the film four out of five stars. Kevin Maher of The Times called the film a "half-baked horror" that is "all context and no content" and rated the film two out of five stars.

References

External links
 
 
 
 

2021 films
2021 directorial debut films
2021 horror films
2021 independent films
2020s psychological horror films
British psychological horror films
British independent films
Films about censorship
Films about film directors and producers
Films about films
Films about missing people
Films set in the 1980s
Films set in 1985
2020s English-language films
2020s British films